Jacques Vergès (5 March 1925 – 15 August 2013) was a Siamese-born French lawyer and anti-colonial activist. Vergès began as a fighter in the French Resistance during World War II, under Charles de Gaulle's Free French forces. After becoming a lawyer, he became well known for his defense of FLN militants during the Algerian War of Independence. He was later involved in a number of controversial and high-profile legal cases, with a series of defendants charged with terrorism, serial murder, crimes against humanity, and war crimes. This includes Nazi officer Klaus Barbie "the Butcher of Lyon" in 1987, terrorist Carlos the Jackal in 1994, and former Khmer Rouge head of state Khieu Samphan in 2008. He also defended infamous Holocaust denier Roger Garaudy in 1998 as well as members of the Baader-Meinhof gang. As a result of taking on such clients, he garnered criticism from members of the public, including intellectuals Bernard-Henri Lévy and Alain Finkielkraut, political-activist Gerry Gable as well as Nazi hunter Serge Klarsfeld. 

Vergès attracted widespread public attention in the 1950s for his use of trials as a forum for expressing views against French colonial rule in Algeria, questioning the authority of the prosecution and causing chaos in proceedings – a method he promoted as "rupture defense" in his book De la stratégie judiciaire. He was imprisoned for his activism in 1960 and temporarily lost his license to officially practice law. He was a supporter of the Palestinian fedayeen in the 1960s. He would later disappear from 1970 to 1978, without ever explaining his whereabouts during that period. An outspoken anti-imperialist, he continued his vocal political activism in the 2000s, including opposing the War on Terror. The media sensationalized his activities with the sobriquet "the Devil's advocate", and Vergès himself contributed to his "notorious" public persona by such acts as titling his autobiography The Brilliant Bastard and giving provocative replies in interviews, such as "I'd even defend Bush! But only if he agrees to plead guilty."

Biography
Born on 5 March 1925 in Ubon Ratchathani, Siam, and brought up on the island of Réunion with his twin brother Paul Vergès. Jacques Vergès was the son of Raymond Vergès, a French doctor from Réunion, and a Vietnamese born-teacher named Pham Thi Khang. In 1942, with his father's encouragement, he sailed to Liverpool to become part of the Free French Forces under Charles de Gaulle, and to participate in the anti-Nazi resistance. He went on to fight in Italy, France, and Germany.

After the end of World War II he entered the University of Paris, where he enrolled in the Faculté des lettres pursuing a degree in history, studying the Hindi and Malagasy languages. In 1945 he joined the Young Communists movement of the French Communist Party, while his father was helping to organize the Reunionese Communist Party. During this time he befriended Eric Honecker, future leader of East Germany, Henri Alleg and Felix Hophouet-Boigny, future President of the Ivory Coast. He would also marry his first wife Karine at this time. His twin brother, Paul, returned to Reunion, later becoming leader of the Communist Party there, and a member of the European Parliament. In 1949 Jacques became president of the AEC (Association for Colonial Students), where he befriended Pol Pot and Khieu Samphan. In 1950, at the request of his Communist mentors, he went to Prague to lead a youth organization for four years. He returned to Paris, where he went on to study law, passing his final exams in 1955. Vergès was then elected Secrétaire of the Conférence du barreau de Paris.

Political activities 
Arriving in Paris, Jacques Vergès joined the French Communist Party (PCF) in 1945. On May 25, 1946, Alexis de Villeneuve, who ran for the legislative elections under the Popular Republican Movement (MRP) against his father, Raymond Vergès.  He was shot and assassinated in front of the cathedral of Saint-Denis Cathedral, Réunion. The weapon used belonged to Raymond Vergès.

Algerian independence movement

After returning to France, Vergès became a lawyer and quickly gained fame for his willingness to take controversial cases. During the struggle in Algiers he defended many accused of terrorism by the French government. He was a supporter of the Algerian armed independence struggle against France, comparing it to French armed resistance to the Nazi German occupation in the 1940s.
Vergès became a nationally known figure following his defence of the anti-French Algerian guerrilla Djamila Bouhired on terrorism charges: she was convicted of blowing up a café and killing eleven people inside it.  This is where he pioneered the rupture strategy, in which he accused the prosecution of the same offenses as the defendants. She was sentenced to death but pardoned and freed following public pressure brought on by Vergès' efforts. After some years she married Vergès, who had by then converted to Islam. In an effort to limit Vergès' success at defending Algerian clients, he was sentenced to two months in jail in 1960 and temporarily lost his licence to officially practice law for anti-state activities. After Algeria gained its independence in 1962, Vergès obtained Algerian citizenship, going by the name of Mansour. During the Algerian War he had become acquainted with Ahmed Ben Bella of the FLN and the first President of Algeria, Swiss Nazi and financier for the FLN, François Genoud, as well as Ahmed Huber, a Swiss Muslim-convert and Nazi who covered the war as a journalist.

Israel and the Palestinians
In 1965, Vergès arrived in Israel, seeking to represent Mahmud Hijazi (מחמוד חיג'אזי), a Palestinian member of the Fatah movement who had at the time been sentenced to death by an Israeli military court on charges of terrorism, for crossing into Israel and setting a small demolition charge near the National Water Conduit in the Galilee. Israel's Justice Minister Dov Yosef forbade Hijazi's being represented by a foreign lawyer. Vergès was detained at the airport and deported. Nevertheless, though Vergès did not succeed in getting to represent Hijazi in court, his initiative generated considerable publicity and controversy which were influential in Hijazi's death sentence being eventually commuted by an appeals court. (Hijazi was later released in a 1971 prisoner exchange).

Missing years
From February 24,1970 to 1978, Vergès disappeared from public view without explanation. He refused to comment about those years, remarking in an interview with Der Spiegel that "It's highly amusing that no one, in our modern police state, can figure out where I was for almost ten years." Vergès was last seen at an anti-colonial rally in Paris. He left his wife, Djamila, and cut off all his ties with his friends and family. Many people wondered if he had been killed, kidnapped, become a spy, or had gone into hiding. His whereabouts during these years have remained a mystery. Many of his close associates of the time assume that he was in Cambodia with the Khmer Rouge, a rumour Pol Pot (Brother #1), Nuon Chea (Brother #2) and Ieng Sary (Brother #3) Vergès was paid to defend Barbie by Swiss Nazi financier François Genoud, who Vergès had met during the Algerian War due to their mutual support for the FLN.

In 1999 Vergès sued Amnesty International on behalf of the government of Togo. In 2001, on behalf of Idriss Déby, president of Chad, Omar Bongo, president of Gabon, and Denis Sassou-Nguesso, President of the Republic of the Congo, he sued François-Xavier Verschave for his book Noir silence denouncing the crimes of the Françafrique on the charges of "offense toward a foreign state leader", using an arcane 1881 law. The attorney general observed how this crime recalled the lese majesty crime; the court thus deemed it contrary to the European Convention on Human Rights, thus leading to Verschave's acquittal.

Saddam Hussein 
After the US-led coalition forces invaded Iraq in March 2003 and deposed Saddam Hussein, many former leaders in the Baathist regime were arrested. In May 2008, Tariq Aziz assembled a team that included Vergès as well as a French-Lebanese and four Italian lawyers. In late 2003, Vergès also offered to defend Hussein after he was approached by Sadam's nephew who was putting a legal team together. However, the Hussein family opted not to use Vergès.

Khieu Samphan 

In April 2008, former Khmer Rouge head of state Khieu Samphan, and old associate of Vergès, made his first appearance at Cambodia's genocide tribunal. Vergès represented Samphan, using the defence that, while Samphan has never denied that many people in Cambodia were killed, as head of state he was not directly responsible.

Personal life 
Jacques Vergès was married twice. He had a son with his first wife with Karine. He would go on to marry his client Djamila Bouhired, having two children with her.

According to The Economist, "history was his first love, and he still sometimes dreamed of deciphering Etruscan or Linear A, unfolding the secrets of mysterious civilizations."

Recovery 
In 2002, he called former Serbian leader Slobodan Milošević “extremely likeabl  In January 2008, he personally supported Tomislav Nikolić, nationalist leader of the Serbian Radical Party.

Death 
Jacques Vergès died on 15 August 2013 of a heart attack in Paris at the age of 88. His funeral was attended by Roland Dumas and Dieudonné M'bala M'bala. Vergès is buried in the Montparnasse Cemetery.

In popular culture
In 1987 Vergès appeared on an episode of the live British discussion television programme After Dark alongside, among others, Eli Rosenbaum, Neal Ascherson, Philippe Daudy and Paul Oestreicher.

Bibliography

Books written by Vergès  (English language)
Note: Few works by Vergès have been translated into English. 
 Mervyn Jones, Ordeal : The Trial of Djamila Bouhired, Condemned to Death, Algiers, July 15th, 1957,  	London, Union of Democratic Control Publications, c. 1958, 1979. "With the complete text of the speech for the defence, by Jacques Vergès."

Books written by Vergès (French language)
 Pour Djamila Bouhired, with Georges Arnaud, Éditions de Minuit, 1957.
 Le droit et la colère, with Michel Zavrian & Maurice Courrégé, Éditions de Minuit, Paris, coll. « Documents », 1960.
 Le crime de colonialisme. Colloque de Rome, 2, 3, 4, février 1962, in Revue Les Temps modernes (N°190), Gallimard, Paris, March 1962.
 De la stratégie judiciaire, Éditions de Minuit, Paris, coll. « Documents », 1968.
 Pour les fidayine. La résistance palestinienne, Éditions de Minuit, Paris, coll. « Documents », Paris, 1969.
 Agenda, Paris, Simoen, 1979
 Pour en finir avec Ponce Pilate, Le Pré aux clercs, 1983
 La Face cachée du procès Barbie. Compte-rendu des débats de Ligoure (with Étienne Bloch), S. Tastet, coll. «  Formule rompue », 1983
 Beauté du crime, Plon, Paris 1988
 Je défends Barbie (preface by Jean-Edern Hallier), Jean Picollec, Paris, coll. « Documents dossiers », 1988
 Le Salaud lumineux, Michel Lafon, 1 January 1990
 La Justice est un jeu, Éditions Albin Michel, 1992
 Lettre ouverte à des amis algériens devenus tortionnaires, Éditions Albin Michel, coll. « Lettre ouverte », 1993
 Mon Dieu pardonnez-leur, Michel Lafon, 1995
 Intelligence avec l'ennemi, Michel Lafon, 1996
 J'ai plus de souvenirs que si j'avais mille ans, Éditions 84, 1999
 Nocturne. Poésie, Éditions Olbia, 2001 (ISBN 978-2719105368)
 Avocat du diable, avocat de Dieu (entretiens avec Alain de La Morandais), Paris : Presses de la Renaissance, 2000 (ISBN 978-2-85616787-8)
 Un procès de la barbarie à Brazzaville (co-author Dior Diagne), Jean Picollec, 2000
 Noir silence, blancs mensonges, Jean Picollec, Paris, 2001
 Les Sanguinaires : sept affaires célèbres, J'ai lu, 2001
 Omar m'a tuer - histoire d'un crime, J'ai lu, 2001
 L'Apartheid judiciaire, with Pierre Marie Gallois, L'Âge d'homme, Lausanne 2002
 Le Suicide de la France, Olbia, 2002
 Dictionnaire amoureux de la justice, Plon, coll. « Dictionnaire amoureux », 2002
 Les Erreurs judiciaires, Presses universitaires de France - PUF, coll. « Que sais-je ? », 2002
 Justice pour le peuple serbe, L'Âge d'Homme, coll. « Collection Objections », 2003
 La Démocratie à visage obscène : le vrai catéchisme de George W. Bush, La Table ronde, 2004
 Les Crimes d'État et comédie judiciaire, Plon, 2004
 Passent les jours et passent les semaines : Journal de l'année 2003-2004, Plon, 2005
 Jacques Vergès, l'anticolonialiste (conversations with Philippe Karim Felissi), Paris : le Félin, coll. « Histoire et sociétés », 2005 (ISBN 2-86645-584-3)
 Malheur aux pauvres, Plon, 2006 (ISBN 978-2259199223)
 Crimes contre l'humanité massacres en Côte d’Ivoire, Pharos, 276 p., avril 2006
 Que mes guerres étaient belles !, Éditions du Rocher, 2007 (ISBN 978-2268060989)
 Journal : La passion de défendre, Éditions du Rocher, 2008 (ISBN 978-2268065069)
 Justice et littérature, Presses universitaires de France, coll. « Questions judiciaires », 2011 (ISBN 978-2130575382)
 « Crimes et fraudes » en Côte d'Ivoire, Édite, 2011 (ISBN 978-2-84608-306-5)
 Sarkozy sous BHL (with Roland Dumas), Éditions Pierre-Guillaume de Roux, 2011, 128 p.
 De mon propre aveu, Éditions Pierre-Guillaume de Roux, 2013 (ISBN 978-2-36371-053-6)

Books and theses about Jacques Vergès (French language)
 Emmanuelle Bosc, Jacques Vergès: la plaidoirie de l'indéfendable par la dénonciation de l'inavouable, sn, 1992
 Robert Charvin, Jacques Vergès : un aristocrate de refus, Paris: Editions L'Harmattan, 2013
 François Dessy, Jacques Vergès, l’ultime plaidoyer : conversations entre confrères avec maître François Dessy, Editions de l'Aube, 2014
 Véronique Martin, Jacques Vergès envers et contre tous, Paris: Editions de Verneuil, 1999
 Bernard Violet and Robert Jégaden, Vergès: le maître de l'ombre, Paris: Seuil, 2000
 Jonathan Widell, Jacques Vergès, devil's advocate: a psychohistory of Vergès' judicial strategy,  Doctor of Civil Law thesis, McGill University, 2012

Filmography
L'Avocat de la terreur (Terror's Advocate), a 2007 documentary about Vergès, directed and narrated by Barbet Schroeder.
 Nigel Kendall, Terror's Advocate, The Times, 13 September 2008
 Jamie Kessler, Films in Brief: Terror's Advocate, Columbia Political Review, 2 December 2007

See also
List of solved missing person cases

Notes

References

External links 

 Robert Chalmers, "Meet Jacques Verges: the lawyer who defended dictators and terrorists for crimes against humanity", GQ Magazine, August 2020.
 Angelique Chrisafis, "Jacques Vergès obituary", The Guardian, 17 August 2013
 Robert D. McFadden, "Jacques Vergès, Defender of Terrorists And War Criminals, Is Dead at 88", The New York Times, 16 August 2013
 "French 'Devil’s advocate' Jacques Vergès dies", France 24, 16 August 2013.
 "Jacques Vergès, French lawyer who defended despised criminals, dies", The Washington Post, 16 August 2013.
 Obituary: Jacques Vergès, The Economist, 24 August 2013
 Alan Riding, "A Life of Smoke and Mystery", The New York Times, 14 October 2007
 Britta Sandberg, »Ich, der brillante Drecksack« (interview, in German). In: Der Spiegel, 1962 (2008), 47, 17 November 2008, .
 Brita Sandberg and Eric Follath, There is no such thing as absolute evil, interview, Der Spiegel, 21 November 2008
Stéphanie Giry, Against the Law, The Nation, 14 August 2009; also: Against the Law, Pulitzer Center
 Chris Tenove, Meeting the Devil's Advocate: An Interview with Jacques Vergès, Justice in Conflict, 26 August 2013.
 Mr. Jacques Vergès, at Extraordinary Chambers in the Courts of Cambodia
Cambodia Tribunal Monitor

1925 births
1970s missing person cases
2013 deaths
Algerian people of French descent
Algerian people of Vietnamese descent
Formerly missing people
Free French military personnel of World War II
French Communist Party politicians
20th-century French lawyers
French Maoists
French Muslims
French people of Vietnamese descent
Missing person cases in France
Jacques Verges
People of French descent from Réunion
People of Vietnamese descent from Réunion
Temporary disappearances
French twins
Jacques Verges
University of Paris alumni
French expatriates in Thailand
Jacques Verges
Jacques Verges
21st-century French lawyers